Owen Gwyn (died 1633) was a Welsh churchman and academic, Master of St John's College, Cambridge from 1612 and Vice-Chancellor of the University of Cambridge in 1615–1616.

Life
He was from Denbighshire, the third son of Griffith Wynn, of the Wynn family of Gwydir. He took up in 1584 one of the scholarships at St John's College founded by his uncle, the lawyer John Gwyn, matriculating at Easter. He graduated B.A. in 1588 and M.A. in 1591; and proceeded B.D. in 1599, D.D. in 1613 . He became a Fellow in 1589. Among his pupils was his cousin John Williams, who later advanced his career. He was rector of Honington in 1605, was elected Master in 1612, and was Vice-Chancellor in 1615/6 . He was also vicar of East Ham, Essex, from 1605 to 1611, and rector of South Luffenham, Rutland, from 1611. Williams made him Archdeacon of Huntingdon in 1622, and a prebendary of Lincoln Cathedral. He was buried in the college chapel, on 5 June 1633.

Notes

Year of birth missing
1633 deaths
17th-century Welsh Anglican priests
Alumni of St John's College, Cambridge
Fellows of St John's College, Cambridge
Masters of St John's College, Cambridge
Vice-Chancellors of the University of Cambridge
People from Denbighshire
People from South Luffenham
People from South Kesteven District